La Cage aux Folles 3: The Wedding is a 1985 comedy film and the third and final installment in the La Cage aux Folles series. Unlike the first two films, which were directed by Édouard Molinaro, this third installment is directed by Georges Lautner.

Plot
In order to inherit his Aunt Emma's large fortune (which includes a large chunk of Scotland), Albin must marry a woman and father a child, and Renato goes along with the plan in an attempt to save their St. Tropez nightclub. Albin consults marriage broker Matrimonia and tries to act like a conservative heterosexual, but all attempts to conform fail and he considers suicide. When all hope seems to be lost, Renato and Albin meet a suicidal young woman, Cindy, who decides that marrying Albin may be better than death.

Cast
 Michel Serrault as Albin Mougeotte / "ZaZa Napoli"
 Ugo Tognazzi as Renato Baldi
 Antonella Interlenghi as Cindy
 Saverio Vallone as Mortimer
 Michel Galabru as Simon Charrier
 Benny Luke as Jacob
 Stéphane Audran as Matrimonia
 Gianluca Favilla as Dulac
 Umberto Raho as Kennedy

Release
As of October 2013, there is no existing DVD of the film in the US. A Region 2 DVD release was released in Italy in 2009 (under its Italian release title Matrimonio Con Vizietto), but it does not include an English-language track.

References

External links
 
 
 
 
 New York Times review

1985 films
1985 comedy films
French comedy films
French LGBT-related films
Italian comedy films
Italian LGBT-related films
1980s French-language films
Cross-dressing in film
Films directed by Georges Lautner
1985 LGBT-related films
Films set in France
Films shot in France
French independent films
French satirical films
French sequel films
TriStar Pictures films
Films scored by Ennio Morricone
Italian independent films
Films with screenplays by Michel Audiard
Italian sequel films
Gay-related films
LGBT-related comedy films
1980s Italian films
1980s French films